"Love Is Your Name" is a song by Aerosmith frontman Steven Tyler. Written by Eric Paslay and Lindsey Lee, it is the lead single from Tyler's debut solo album, We're All Somebody from Somewhere, which was released on July 15, 2016.  Like the album, the single is a country song. The song was recorded at Blackbird Studios in Nashville, Tennessee with backing band Loving Mary and was produced by Dann Huff. The single was released on May 13, 2015 to all digital platforms.

Background
Tyler moved to Nashville in January 2015 and has been working with songwriters on new material for his album since then. "Love Is Your Name" was the first song that came out of those sessions. In April, Tyler officially signed a record deal with Scott Borchetta's Dot Records (a subsidiary of the Big Machine Label Group).

Tyler explained that his appreciation for country music has deep roots, identifying The Everly Brothers, Patsy Cline, Dan Hicks, and The Lovin' Spoonful, artists he listened to growing up, among his influences in country and folk.

The song begins with an autoharp, a musical instrument rarely heard in modern country music. The song also features fiddles and banjos.

Promotion
On the day of the single's release on May 13, the song premiered on 120 mainstream country radio stations across the United States through iHeartMedia. Tyler was also interviewed about the song on the Bobby Bones Show, which is syndicated to 80 radio stations and also available through digital subscription. On television, Tyler was interviewed by Nancy O'Dell; this interview was broadcast on CBS This Morning and Entertainment Tonight. Later that evening, on the season 14 finale of American Idol, Tyler performed the song, followed by a duet with Idol third-place finisher Jax of the Janis Joplin song "Piece of My Heart".

On June 13, Tyler will rejoin his Aerosmith bandmates for the Blue Army Tour, which will send the band to 17 locations across North America through August 7 of 2015. After the tour, Tyler plans to return to the studio to finish his country album.

Commercial performance
The song debuted on the Country Airplay chart at No. 33, helped by hourly plays on iHeartMedia stations in its first day of release on May 13.  It also debuted on the Hot Country Songs chart at No. 27, selling 25,000 copies in its first week. The song debuted at 75 on the Billboard Hot 100.  The song has sold 110,000 copies in the US as of February 2016.

Music video
On July 3, 2015, Tyler released the music video for "Love Is Your Name" on Facebook and YouTube. The video was directed by Trey Fanjoy.

Chart performance

References

http://tasteofcountry.com/steven-tyler-love-is-your-name/

2015 singles
Steven Tyler songs
Songs written by Eric Paslay
2015 songs
Song recordings produced by Dann Huff
Dot Records singles
Music videos directed by Trey Fanjoy